Kazbek Akbaev (born 1981) is a Chess Grandmaster titled in 2015. He was born in Russia.

References

External links
 

Kazbek Akbaev chess games at 365Chess.com

Chess grandmasters
1981 births
Living people